Novorossiya Governorate, was a governorate of the Russian Empire in the previously Ottoman and Cossack territories, that existed from 1764 until the 1783 administrative reform. It was created and governed according to the "Plan for the Colonization of New Russia Governorate" issued by the Russian Senate. It became the first region in Russia where Catherine the Great allowed foreign Jews to settle.

Most of its territories belonged to the Zaporozhian Sich as well as the Poltava Regiment and Myrhorod Regiment of the Cossack Hetmanate. Its establishment was strategically successful and advantageous for Russia, and after the conclusion of the Russian war against Turkey in 1774 it gave a way for it to access the Black Sea and establish an area that became known as Novorossiya ("New Russia"). It was created based on the Military Frontier of the Austrian Empire against the Ottoman Empire and involved many military units from the region that were resettled in Ukraine. The military units included mounted cossacks (or hussars) and mounted pikers (or lancers).

In 1796, the governorate was reestablished, but with the centre not in Kremenchug but in Yekaterinoslav, and in 1802 was split into three governorates: the Yekaterinoslav Governorate, the Taurida Governorate, the Nikolayev Governorate (known as the Kherson Governorate from 1803).

History
The governorate united the territories of New Serbia, Slavo-Serbia, and the Slobidskyi regiment (today in Kirovohrad Oblast) which were the northern regions of Buhohard Palatinate (Zaporizhian Sich). The governorate, centered in the fortress of Saint Elizabeth, initially was divided into three territories (polki) assigned to each regiment in the area: Elizabeth City Pikers Regiment, Black Hussars Regiment, and Yellow Hussars Regiment.

As of  the governorate also included the so-called Ukrainian Line, a line of Russian built fortresses between Dnieper and Donets) that was administrated by the Dnieper and Donets Pikers regiments (based on the Habsburg's Pandurs, the cossacks of Poltava, the Myrhorod regiments), the Slavo-Serbia with Luhansk Pikers Regiment, and the Raiko Preradovic and Ivan Sevic Hussars regiments (soon the later two were united into the Bakhmut Hussars Regiment) as well as the Samara Hussar Regiment (originally the Moldavian Hussars Regiment based in Kiev).

The first capital of the governorate was the city of Kremenchug (1765) with the fortress of Saint Elizabeth (today Kropyvnytskyi) serving that administrative function previously (1764).

Pikers unrest
In 1769-70 during the 1768-74 Russian-Ottoman War there was an uprising among the Dnieper and Donets Pikers regiments. The unrest started on territory of today's Poltava Oblast and eventually spread across the lands of the Zaporizhian Host. It was mercilessly put down by Russian Imperial forces and its instigators were punished by knout or sent to katorga. The Donets Pikers Regiment eventually was forcefully sent to the war where it played a key role in forcing Syvash, taken of Perekop, Caffa (Feodosiya).

Destruction of Zaporizhian Sich
In June 1775 the Russian Imperial Army razed the capital of the Zaporizhian Sich, after which all its lands were annexed to the Novorossiysk Governorate. The following year the Bakhmut and Catherine provinces were transferred to the newly established Azov Governorate.

Subdivisions
The governorate was subdivided into 12 provinces (circuluses) and further into uyezdes (counties). The city of Yekaterinoslav (today - Novomoskovsk) was located in Azov Governorate. The city of Yekaterinoslav (today - Dnipro) was located in Novorossiya Governorate.

List of provinces (circuluses):
Territories before partitioning of the Sich
 Olviopolsk – Olviopol (today Pervomaisk)
 Elizabethgrad – Elizabethgrad (today Kropyvnytskyi)
 Krukov – Krukov (today the city district of Kremenchuk)
 Kremenchuk – Kremenchuk (the administrative center of the governorate)
 Poltava – Poltava
 Novo-Senzhar – Novo-Senzhar (today Novi Sanzhary)
Added territories after partitioning
 Kherson – Kherson (newly built settlement with fortress and the main Black Sea Admiralty)
 Novopavlovsk – Novopavlovsk (today Voznesensk)
 Ingulsk – Ingulsk (today village of Inhulo-Kamianka in Kropyvnytskyi Raion)
 Slavensk – Slavensk (today Nikopol)
 Kisikermen – Kisikermen (today Beryslav)
 Saksagan – Saksagan (today village of Saksahan in Kamianske Raion, Dnipropetrovsk Oblast)

Second establishment
In December 1796, Paul I reestablished the Novorossiya Governorate, mostly with land from the former Yekaterinoslav Viceroyalty. In 1802, this province was divided into the Nikolayev Governorate (known as the Kherson Governorate from 1803), the Yekaterinoslav Governorate, and the Taurida Governorate.

A Decree of 12 December 1796 set up a serf system on the territory of South Ukraine and Caucasus by attaching peasants to the land.

Novorossiysk-Bessarabia General Governorate 
The Novorossiysk and Bessarabian General Governorate was formed on May 23, 1822, with the center in Odessa. It consisted of the Kherson, Yekaterinoslav and Tauride provinces, as well as the Odessa, Taganrog, Feodosiya and Kerch-Yenikalsky city administrations. Nevertheless, Duke Richelieu, who was appointed to this position in 1805, was still considered the governor of the Novorossiysk Territory.

The Governate was abolished in 1874.

Subdivisions
 Bakhmut Province (1764-1775) transferred to the Azov Governorate
 Kremenchug Province
 Yekaterine Province
 Yelizaveta Province

Governors

General Governors
 1764-65 
 1765-66 
 1766-74 
 1774-91 Grigory Potemkin
 1791-96 Platon Zubov
 1796-97 
 1805-14 Duc de Richelieu
 1815-22 Alexandre de Langeron
 1822-23 Ivan Inzov 
 1822-54 Mikhail Vorontsov
 1830-32 Friedrich von der Pahlen
 1854-55 Nicholas Annenkov
 1855-64 Alexander Stroganov
 1864-73 Paul Demetrius von Kotzebue

Viceroys (namestnik)
 1779-83 
 1783-88 
 1788–94 Vasiliy Kakhovsky
 1794–96 Iosif Khorvat
 1797–1800 Ivan Seletsky
 1800–01 Ivan Nikolayev
 1801–02 Mikhail Miklashevsky

See also 
 Yekaterinoslav Viceroyalty
 New Russia

References

External links

 Yekaterinoslav Guberniya – Historical coat of arms
 New Russia Governorate at the Encyclopedia of Ukraine
 Katerinoslav Governorate – Article in the Encyclopedia of Ukraine

 N 48.43649 E 35.04639 

 

Governorates of the Russian Empire
Governorates of Ukraine
1764 establishments in the Russian Empire
1802 disestablishments in the Russian Empire
States and territories established in 1764
States and territories disestablished in 1802
18th century in the Zaporozhian Host
Zaporizhian Sich